James McLuggage, (September 1865 – 1949) was an Irish footballer who played in the English Football League for Accrington.

Early career
The first record of James McLuggage was when he signed for (Aged 19/20) Royal Albert, a club based in Larkhall, Scotland.
After two years he signed for Third Lanark. A club founded in 1872 and who had twice reached the Scottish Cup Final in the 1870s.
After one year James McLuggage moved to Cowlairs, a Scottish club founded in 1876 from the Railway works in that area.

Season 1889-1890
In 1889 James McLuggage moved to England and signed for Accrington. He made his Club and League debut, on the left wing, on 14 September 1889 at Pikes Lane, the then home of Bolton Wanderers. Accrington won 4-2 and James McLuggage scored. McLuggage' goal is described in Cricket & Football Field of 14 September 1889. After Accrington went 1-0 up the article said, "This reverse spurred up the home team and they got very near at the other end, but the game again veered in the former's direction, and the citadel (the home goal), fell to a header from McLuggage, the game having been in progress forty minutes." It was 2–0 to Accrington at Half-Time. In the second-half Accrington led 4–1 in the closing minutes. The article said, "Roberts missed a chance close in four minutes off time, whilst a scrimmage almost resulted in a goal for the Wanderers, and McLuggage shot over the bar at the other end."
McLuggage played in all Accrington' first eight League matches, on the left wing, scoring in the opening two matches. After the defeat at Deepdale, Preston on 9 November 1889 (3-1) McLuggage was either dropped or injured. The fact is he moved  to Hyde F.C. in 1889 and never played English League Football again.

Post League Career
McLuggage moved in 1889 to Hyde F.C. There is no information on this club. 
In 1891 he returned to Royal Albert in Scotland. How long he stayed there and when his football career ended is not recorded.

Post Football
Nothing is recorded as to where McLuggage worked and lived after his football career was over. He had a long life and passed away in 1949 aged 80/81.

References

Irish footballers
Accrington F.C. players
Royal Albert F.C. players
Third Lanark A.C. players
Cowlairs F.C. players
1865 births
1949 deaths
Association football forwards